Ensenada Blanca is a community of Loreto Municipality, in Baja California Sur state, Mexico.

It is located about 45 km south of the city of Loreto.

Population
Ensenada Blanca had a 2010 census population of 255 inhabitants.  It is the second-largest community in Loreto Municipality, after the municipal seat of Loreto.

References 

Loreto Municipality (Baja California Sur)
Populated places in Baja California Sur